Metropolitan Youth Symphony is a youth orchestra organization in Portland, Oregon, U.S.

Founded in 1974 by Lajos Balogh with just a handful of students, it is now one of the largest youth orchestra groups in the country.  It has about 500 students, twelve conductors and fourteen ensembles with multiple experience levels.
The symphony accepts young musicians of school ages kindergarten through early college and all levels of experience.  The primary goal is to challenge students to learn and perform music in a friendly and rewarding atmosphere.

Metropolitan Youth Symphony's current Music Director is Costa Rican-born conductor and violinist Raúl Gómez.

MYS ensembles include:
 Symphony Orchestra, conducted by Raúl Gómez
 Symphonic Band, conducted by Patrick Murphy
 Concert Orchestra, conducted by Jeffrey Peyton
Sinfonietta Orchestra, conducted by Giancarlo Castro D'Addona
 Vivaldi Strings, conducted by Brian Quincey
 Concert Band, conducted by Cynthia Plank
 Baroque Strings, conducted by Adam LaMotte
 Interlude Orchestra, conducted by Nita Van Pelt
 Overture Strings, conducted by Marian Gutiérrez
 Jazz Ensemble, conducted by Ryan Meagher
 Jazz Band, conducted by Greg McKelvey
 MYSfits String Ensemble, conducted by Raúl Gómez
 MYSticks Percussion Ensemble, directed by Michael Roberts

Metropolitan Youth Symphony ensembles present a dozen public concerts each year in the Portland metropolitan area.  In addition, it serves schools throughout Oregon with an outreach music program that visits up to twenty public schools each year.

References

External links 
 
 2011 Symphony final performance video (2 m 50 s)

Musical groups from Portland, Oregon
Musical groups established in 1974
American youth orchestras
1974 establishments in Oregon
Youth organizations based in Oregon
Orchestras based in Oregon